Savaari is a 2020 Indian Telugu-language romantic comedy film directed by Saahith Mothkuri in his feature film debut and starring Nandu and Priyanka Sharma.

Cast 
Nandu as Raju
Priyanka Sharma as Baaghi
Horse as Badshah
Shiva Kumar as Sandy
Srikanth Reddy Ganta as Kaali

Production 
The film was announced to be a romantic comedy directed by newcomer Saahith Mothkuri. It was initially announced that Rashmi Gautam would star as the female lead and feature music by Prashanth R Vihari; however, these reports proved to be false. The film's main characters include a horse, Nandu,  and Priyanka Sharma. Nandu portrayed a man from a slum in the film.

Soundtrack 
The songs were composed by Shekar Chandra. A single "Nee Kannulu" was released in October 2019. The song "Undipova Nuvvila" written by Purna Chary gained attention upon release.

Release 
The film was released on 7 February 2020. Film Companion wrote that "The biggest problem is that it just doesn’t know how to handle its drama". The Times of India gave the film a rating of two-and-half out of five and stated that "With the kind of set-up given and nothing exciting panning out, Savaari doesn’t leave you with a smile on your face".

References

External links 

2020 directorial debut films
2020 films
Indian romantic comedy films
2020 romantic comedy films
2020s Telugu-language films